Jean-Étienne-Marie Portalis (1 April 1746 – 25 August 1807) was a French jurist and politician in the time of the French Revolution and the First Empire. His son, Joseph Marie Portalis, was a diplomat and statesman.

Biography

Early years
Portalis was born at Le Beausset, currently in the Var département of  Provence, France to a bourgeois family, and was educated by the Oratorians at their schools in Toulon and Marseille, and then went to the University of Aix. As a student, he published his first two works, Observations sur Émile (on Jean-Jacques Rousseau's Emile: Or, On Education) in 1763 and Des Préjugés in 1764.

In 1765 he became a lawyer at the parlement of Aix-en-Provence, and soon obtained so great a reputation that he was instructed by Étienne François de Choiseul in 1770 to draw up the decree authorizing the marriage of Protestants. From 1778 to 1781, Portalis was one of the four assessors or administrators of Provence.

Revolution
In November 1793, after the First French Republic had been proclaimed, he came to Paris and was thrown into prison for being the brother-in-law of Joseph Jérôme Siméon, the leader of the Federalists in Provence. He was soon released to a maison de santé, where he remained until the fall of Maximilien Robespierre during the Thermidorian Reaction.

On being released he practised as a lawyer in Paris, and, in 1795, he was elected by the capital to the Council of Ancients of the French Directory, becoming a leader of the moderate party opposed to the directory rule. As a leader of the moderates, he was targeted by the coup d'état of 18 Fructidor, but, unlike General Charles Pichegru and François Barbé-Marbois, he managed to escape to Switzerland, then to Holstein, and did not return until after Napoleon Bonaparte established himself as the leader of the new Consulate.

Under Napoleon
Bonaparte made him a conseiller d'état in 1800, and then charged him, with François Denis Tronchet, Félix-Julien-Jean Bigot de Préameneu, and Jacques de Maleville, to draw up the Code Civil. Of this commission he was the most notable member, and many of the most important titles, notably those on marriage and heirship, are his work. He gave a famous speech, "Discours préliminaire au projet de code civil" in which he presented the core principles of the civil code: legal certainty (non-retroactivity), the notion of "ordre public" and the forbidding of the "arrêt de règlement" which was a characteristic production of the Ancien Régime's judges and was contrary to the idea that only the law prevails.

In 1801 he was placed in charge of the Department of Religion or Public Worship, and in that capacity had the chief share in drawing up the provisions of the Concordat of 1801. In 1803 he became a member of the Académie française, in 1804 Minister of Public Worship, and in 1805 a Chevalier Grand-Croix de la Légion d'honneur. He soon after became totally blind, and, after an operation, he died at Paris.

References
 In turn, it cites as references:
Oeuvres by F. Portalis (1823)
Frederick Portalis, Documents, rapports, et travaux inédits sur le Code Civil (1844); Sur le Concordat (1845)
René Lavole, Portalis, sa vie et ses œvres (Paris, 1869)

External links 
 Preliminary Address on the first draft of the Civil Code

1746 births
1807 deaths
People from Var (department)
First French Empire
French essayists
French political writers
Members of the Académie Française
Burials at the Panthéon, Paris
People of the French Revolution
French legal scholars
Philosophers of law
Chevaliers of the Légion d'honneur
French Ministers of Religious Affairs
French male essayists
French political philosophers